The women's single event at the 2018 World Singles Ninepin Bowling Classic Championships was held in Cluj-Napoca, Romania. Qualification took place on 21-22 May, while the knock-out phase from 24 May to 26 May 2018.

Results

Qualification 

32 players qualified for the knock-out phase.

Finals 

According to the results of the qualification, 32 players were put together in bouts, which took place on standard match rules - 4 sets of 30 throws. The competitor who obtains a larger number of sets wins. With an equal number of sets decides a higher total score.

References 

2018
Women's single